Sennoye is a rural locality (a selo) in Karachunskoye Rural Settlement, Ramonsky District, Voronezh Oblast, Russia. The population was 96 as of 2010. There are 6 streets.

Geography 
Sennoye is located on the right bank of the Voronezh River, 26 km north of Ramon (the district's administrative centre) by road. Sindyakino is the nearest rural locality.

References 

Rural localities in Ramonsky District